Superman and Batman versus Aliens and Predator is a comic book co-published by DC Comics and Dark Horse Comics which holds the rights to both Alien and Predator. It was written by Mark Schultz, with art by Ariel Olivetti. It is a crossover in which Superman and Batman have to battle both the Aliens and Predator.   While both superheroes have had crossovers with the monsters individually, this was the first time they were with both at the same time. The two-part series was released on January 8 and then on February 14, 2007.

Plot

The story takes place somewhere in the Andes. It is revealed that during the Ice Age, a Predator ship landed on Earth and could not leave because it could not escape its gravitational pull. The Predators landed in a then-dormant volcano. Now in our modern time, a mountain climbing crew has gone missing in the Andes. Batman becomes the emissary of Superman, whom the Predators believe to be a sun spirit, through a show of strength. They decide to help the Predators leave Earth for the good of themselves and the planet.

Publication

Superman and Batman vs. Aliens and Predator (by Mark Schultz and Ariel Olivetti, two-issue miniseries, January 2007, tpb, 112 pages, DC Comics, May 2007)

Other media

Merchandise
In 2019, toy company  NECA unveiled a series of action figure box sets inspired by the crossover, as well as the prior Superman/Aliens and Batman vs Predator miniseries. The figure sets included:

 Superman and Xenomorph
 Armored Batman and Predator
 Batman and Joker Xenomorph
 Green Lantern (Hal Jordan) (with alternate John Stewart head) and Sinestro Corps Predator

See also

Superman/Aliens
Superman/Batman
Aliens Versus Predator
Superman vs. Predator
Batman/Aliens
Batman Versus Predator
Batman: Dead End

References

External links
DC page

2007 comics debuts
2007 comics endings
Alien vs. Predator (franchise) comics
Crossover comics
Intercompany crossovers
Dark Horse Comics limited series
DC Comics limited series
Batman titles
Superman titles